William Kwong Yu Yeung (born 1960; also known simply as Bill Yeung) is a Hong Kong-born, Canadian amateur astronomer with telescopes based in the United States.

He is a prolific discoverer of asteroids and also discovered the comet 172P/Yeung. He also discovered the object J002E3, which was first thought to be an asteroid, but is now known to be part of a Saturn V Rocket that propelled Apollo 12 into space. He worked first from "Rock Finder Observatory" (IAU code 652) in Calgary, Alberta, and now works from Arizona's Desert Beaver Observatory  and Desert Eagle Observatory .

Awards and honors 

The outer main-belt asteroid 40776 Yeungkwongyu, discovered by astronomer Roy Tucker at Goodricke-Pigott Observatory in 1999, was named in his honor. The official naming citation was published by the Minor Planet Center on 9 June 2017.

List of discovered minor planets 

Yeung is one of the most prolific discoverers of minor planets, credited by the Minor Planet Center with more than 2,000 numbered minor planets. The list below gives most of his discoveries in groups of 50 bodies, sorted by ascending number.

See also

References

External links 
 Homepage (Desert Eagle Observatory)

1960 births
20th-century Canadian astronomers
21st-century Canadian astronomers
Canadian expatriates in the United States
Hong Kong scientists

Discoverers of asteroids
Discoverers of comets
Hong Kong emigrants to Canada
Living people
Naturalized citizens of Canada